Jonathan Charles Smith (born January 18, 1979) is an American college football coach who is currently the head coach at Oregon State University. He was previously the co-offensive coordinator and quarterbacks coach for the Washington Huskies. He arrived in Seattle in 2014 as part of the staff of new head coach Chris Petersen. As a player, he was a four-year starter at quarterback at Oregon State in Corvallis under head coaches Mike Riley and Dennis Erickson.

Smith was previously the quarterbacks coach for two seasons at Boise State, also under Petersen, and the offensive coordinator for two seasons at Montana.  He was the quarterbacks coach for six seasons (2004–2009) at Idaho under three head coaches: Nick Holt, Erickson, and Robb Akey. Prior to his tenure with the Vandals in Moscow, Smith was a graduate assistant at his alma mater in 2002 and 2003 under Erickson and Riley.

Early years
Born in Pasadena, California, Smith graduated from Glendora High School in east Los Angeles County in 1997. He went north to play college football at Oregon State, and was originally a walk-on under head coach Mike Riley.

Smith was a four-year starter for the Beavers at quarterback, taking over midway through his redshirt freshman season in 1998 and maintaining the job through his senior season in 2001. As a junior in 2000 under Dennis Erickson, he led the Beavers to their greatest season in school history. The Beavers finished , a school record for wins, and won a share of their first conference title in 36 years, and finished the season ranked fourth in the country. His wide receivers on the team included future NFL players Chad Johnson and T. J. Houshmandzadeh. Smith was the MVP of the Fiesta Bowl.

College statistics

Coaching career

Oregon State 
Smith was named Oregon State's head coach on November 29, 2017. He took the reins of his alma mater in a tumultuous period after Gary Andersen quit on October 9, 2017, six games in to his third season. Oregon State was 12-36 in its previous four seasons upon Smith's arrival.

Smith broke through in his fourth season leading Oregon State, posting his first winning record at 7-6 and receiving an invite to the 2021 LA Bowl.

The Beavers took the next step in 2022, posting the third 10-win season in program history after soundly defeating Florida 30-3 in the 2022 Las Vegas Bowl.

Smith's initial five-year deal in 2017 paid him $1.9 million annually and automatically extended by one year after every six-win season. On January 7, 2020, Smith received a three-year extension through the 2025 season. After his first winning season in 2021, Smith's contract was rewritten, keeping him signed through the 2027 season and calling for him to make $3.25 million beginning in the 2022 season. After a historic season for the program in 2022 and a win over Oregon, Smith's received a new deal with another significant pay increase. The new six-year deal raised his salary to $4.85 million beginning in 2023. Smith's new deal reportedly placed him at fifth in the Pac-12 in compensation, including ahead of his in-state counterpart Dan Lanning.

Head coaching record

College

References

External links
 Oregon State profile
 Washington profile

1979 births
Living people
American football quarterbacks
Boise State Broncos football coaches
Idaho Vandals football coaches
Oregon State Beavers football coaches
Oregon State Beavers football players
Montana Grizzlies football coaches
Washington Huskies football coaches
People from Glendora, California
Sportspeople from Pasadena, California
Players of American football from Pasadena, California